Agrisius dubatolovi is a moth of the subfamily Arctiinae. It is found in Thailand.

References

Moths described in 2012
Lithosiini
Moths of Asia